Dejando Huella (Eng.: Leaving a Mark) is the title of a compilation album by Mexican Norteño-Sax band Conjunto Primavera. This album became their third number-one set on the Billboard Top Latin Albums.

Track listing
The information from Billboard

CD track listing

DVD track listing
This information from Allmusic.

Chart performance

References 

Conjunto Primavera albums
2004 greatest hits albums
2004 video albums
Music video compilation albums